Viyar (also Romanized as Vīyar, Veyar, and Vīr; also known as Vīār) is a village in Sonbolabad Rural District of the Central District of Soltaniyeh County, Zanjan province, Iran. At the 2006 National Census, its population was 2,924 in 752 households, when it was in Soltaniyeh District of Abhar County. The following census in 2011 counted 3,131 people in 922 households. The latest census in 2016 showed a population of 3,548 people in 1,075 households, by which time it was the newly established Soltaniyeh County. It was the largest village in its rural district.

References 

Soltaniyeh County

Populated places in Zanjan Province

Populated places in Soltaniyeh County